Hanksy is the pseudonym for street artist and parodist Adam Lucas Himebauch, who is based in New York City. His artwork includes recreations of Banksy street art adapted to include the face of actor Tom Hanks.

Beginning in 2022, Lucas has been working under his actual name and has advertised a documentary film chronicling his artistic origins.

Work 
Lucas is recognized for painting pun-themed work related to popular culture on the street; for instance, in the work that inspired his artist name, Hanksy combined the body of Banksy's classic rat with a cartoon face of actor Tom Hanks. The image went viral on social media, encouraging Hanksy to develop and expand his portfolio of popular culture mashup puns. Since 2011, Hanksy has created hundreds of images that he continues to paste on the streets but also paint on canvases that are exhibited across the country. Banksy has yet to comment on the parody; however, Tom Hanks is supportive of the work and shared a photograph posing next to Hanksy on his Twitter account.

In 2015 he made work critical of Donald Trump's run for President of the United States. The image he created in protest, dubbed Tronald Dump by the Huffington Post, depicted the then candidate as a cartoonish pile of feces with flies encircling his head.

Career 
Hanksy's work has been discussed in numerous publications including: The New York Times, Rolling Stone, Los Angeles Magazine and The Washington Post and in 2016, a documentary series related to his installation Surplus Candy aired on Ovation TV.

Installations 
In addition to his street and canvas art, Hanksy has created several interactive installations meant to engage his audience in innovative and participatory ways.

Surplus Candy (2014-ongoing) 
Sparked by the success of the Best of the Worst installation, Hanksy began his Surplus Candy initiative—highly interactive events that he has hosted in multiple cities including New York City and Los Angeles. In each installment, Hanksy secures an abandoned space, transforming it with art and activity, then opens that space up to the public for only a couple of hours before taking it down. In 2014, when he first hosted Surplus Candy in Manhattan, Hanksy included twenty other artists.[6] In 2015, when he installed the show in a dilapidated mansion in the historic West Adams district in Los Angeles, over 90 artists were involved.

Best of the Worst (2015) 
In 2015, Hanksy mounted an interactive exhibition entitled Best of the Worst that featured some of his signature pun pieces, including portraits of Bill Murrito, Hamuel L. Jackson, Kanye Brest, Traylor Swift, Pikajew, Drak-o Malfoy and Mile E. Coyote. In addition to exhibiting his own work, Hanksy showcased pieces by fellow street artists, built a functional skateboarding ramp, included a photo booth, arcade games, balloon artist and a live-DJ.

To generate awareness of the exhibition and active interest in attending, Hanksy created Golden Tickets that he hid throughout Manhattan, teasing their location on social media. A homage to the 1971 fantasy film, Willy Wonka and the Chocolate Factory, these tickets introduced the interactive nature of the event but also could be traded in for a limited edition work by the artist. The exhibition itself took place at a former Chase Bank on the Lower East Side that Hanksy transformed to look like a street in Chinatown.

TV series 
To preserve a record of Hanksy's temporary installations, Ovation TV launched a six-episode series called "Hanksy Presents: Surplus Candy."

References 

American graffiti artists
Living people
Street artists
Pseudonymous artists
Year of birth missing (living people)